Tin Cup Oil Field is located in San Juan County,  approximately  southeast of Blanding, Utah.  Production is from a northwest–southeast trending  carbonate buildup in the Pennsylvanian Upper Ismay.  The field is part of the Paradox Basin that extends from the states of Colorado to Utah and New Mexico.   

The petroleum reservoir is a carbonate phylloid algal lime wackestone to packstone. The fields are mostly algal mounds, with thick sections saturated with oil.

Discovery 

The Field was discovered in 1981 by  Marathon Oil Company, with the drilling of the Marathon Oil Co., #1-25 Tin Cup Mesa.  Initial shut in pressure was 2,046 psig at 5,500 feet.

The initial well was completed in both the Desert Creek and the Ismay Formations.  Additional development wells were drilled, and a water flood was initiated during 1985 for pressure maintenance.

Currently the field is operated by Mar/Reg Oil Company, an independent oil company based in Nevada.

Geology 

The field is composed of a natural gas cap, oil column and is underlain by an active water zone.  Due to low energy prices during the late 1980s additional field development was stopped.

The field has cumulative oil production of 2.6 million barrels of oil and 10 billion cubic feet of natural gas.
The field consists of limestone horizon with vertical fractures that run northeast–southwest.  Due to the fracturing, the field is not efficiently drained.

Regional setting:  South-central Paradox Basin.

Producing formation(s):  Pennsylvanian-Upper Ismay zone of the Paradox Formation approximately 5,500 feet depth.
Additional production is from the Honaker Trail and the Desert Creek formations.

Type of trap:  Stratigraphic, carbonate algal-mound.

Oil composition 
Crude oil produced has the following composition:

 43.6     -      API gravity
 Pour point  -   15 degree F.
 Color      -    Yellow-brown
 Sulfur content - Low
 Viscosity   -   0.4 cps

Natural gas composition 

 BTU               -  1340 to 1470
 Specific gravity  - .496

Additional studies by the Utah Department of Geology has encouraged the drilling of horizontal wells to efficiently drain the reservoir.

Paradox Basin. Final Report US Department of Energy

References  

Geography of San Juan County, Utah
Natural gas fields in the United States
Oil fields in Utah
Buildings and structures in San Juan County, Utah